The Bells of St. Mary's (1945) is an American musical comedy-drama film, produced and directed by Leo McCarey and starring Bing Crosby and Ingrid Bergman. Written by Dudley Nichols and based on a story by McCarey, the film is about a priest and a nun who, despite their good-natured rivalry, try to save their school from being shut down. The character Father O'Malley had been previously portrayed by Crosby in the 1944 film Going My Way, for which he won the Academy Award for Best Actor. The film was produced by Leo McCarey's production company, Rainbow Productions.

Plot
The unconventional Father Charles "Chuck" O'Malley (Bing Crosby) is assigned to St. Mary's parish, which includes a run-down inner-city school building on the verge of being condemned. O'Malley is to recommend whether or not the school should be closed and the children sent to another school with modern facilities; but the sisters feel that God will provide for them.

They put their hopes in Horace P. Bogardus (Henry Travers), a businessman who has constructed a modern building next door to the school which they hope he will donate to them. Father O'Malley and the dedicated but stubborn Sister Superior, Mary Benedict (Ingrid Bergman), both wish to save the school, but their different views and methods often lead to disagreements. One such involves student Eddie (Dickie Tyler), who is being bullied by another. A more serious one regards the promotion of an eighth-grade student, Patsy (Joan Carroll) of Syracuse, New York, whom the parish has taken in while her mother attempts to get back on her feet.

Sister Benedict contracts tuberculosis and the physician recommends to Father O'Malley that she be transferred to a dry climate with non-parochial duties, but without telling her the reason. She assumes the transfer is because of her disagreements with O'Malley and struggles to understand the reasons for the path set out for her. Just before Sister Benedict departs, Father O'Malley reveals the true reason for her temporary transfer, and she then leaves happily, looking forward to her return.

Cast

Reception
Bosley Crowther of The New York Times felt that the film was too similar to Going My Way, and  "although a plenteous and sometimes winning show, lacks the charm of its predecessor—and that comparison cannot be escaped." The reviewer for Variety wrote: "Picture is packed with many simple scenes that tug at the heart and loosen the tears as directed by McCarey and played by the outstanding cast." Harrison's Reports commented: "As in Going My Way, which he also wrote, produced, and directed, Leo McCarey has proved again that great pictures do not require pretentious stories ... The acting of the entire cast is excellent. Crosby delights one with his ease and natural charm, and Miss Bergman will undoubtedly rise to new heights of popularity because of the effective way in which she portrays her role." John McCarten of The New Yorker wrote derisively: "Mr. McCarey seems to view the Roman Catholic Church, which is quite a formidable and venerable organization, as a kind of settlement house where good works and jollity provide a lively substitute for religion ... Everything, of course, turns out quite happily, except, perhaps, for those captious souls who regard religion as an adult matter."

The Bells of St. Mary's placed fourth on Film Dailys year-end nationwide poll of 559 critics naming the best films of 1946.

Box-office
The film earned receipts of $8 million in North America during its initial run, making it the highest-grossing movie of 1945 in the USA.

It made a profit of $3,715,000, making it the most profitable film in the history of RKO. Adjusted for inflation, it is considered the 57th highest-grossing film of all time.

Soundtrack
 "Aren't You Glad You're You?" (Jimmy Van Heusen / Johnny Burke) sung by Bing Crosby
 "Adeste Fideles" sung by Bing Crosby and children's choir
 "In the Land of Beginning Again" (George W. Meyer / Grant Clarke) sung by Bing Crosby
 "O Sanctissima" sung by Bing Crosby
 "It's Spring" ("Vårvindar friska" in Swedish) sung by Ingrid Bergman
 "The Bells of St. Mary's" sung by Bing Crosby and choir

Bing Crosby recorded four of the songs for Decca Records and these were issued as singles as well as a 2-disc 78 rpm album titled Selections from The Bells of St. Mary's. “Aren't You Glad You're You” was in the Billboard charts for nine weeks with a peak position of #8. "In the Land of Beginning Again" and "The Bells of St. Mary's" both charted briefly also. Crosby's songs were also included in the Bing's Hollywood series.

Awards
The film won the Academy Award for Best Sound Recording (Stephen Dunn). It was nominated for Best Actor in a Leading Role (Bing Crosby), Best Actress in a Leading Role (Ingrid Bergman), Best Director, Best Film Editing, Best Music, Scoring of a Dramatic or Comedy Picture, Best Music, Song (for Jimmy Van Heusen (music) and Johnny Burke (lyrics) for "Aren't You Glad You're You") and Best Picture.

Bing Crosby's Academy Award nomination for his portrayal of Father Chuck O'Malley made him the first actor in history to receive two nominations for portraying the same character.

Adaptations
 The screenplay was adapted into a novel by George Victor Martin.
 There were two radio adaptations of The Bells of St. Mary's on The Screen Guild Theater radio program. Both starred Bing Crosby and Ingrid Bergman. They were broadcast on August 26, 1946 and October 6, 1947.
 A television adaptation on videotape of The Bells of St. Mary's was shown in 1959, starring Claudette Colbert, Marc Connelly, Glenda Farrell, Nancy Marchand, Barbara Myers, Robert Preston, and Charles Ruggles. It was directed by Tom Donovan.

Cultural impact 
The Bells of St. Mary's has come to be associated with the Christmas season, probably because of the inclusion of a scene involving a Christmas pageant at the school, a major plot point involving an unlikely (yet prayed for) gift, and the film's having been released in December 1945.

In the 1946 film It's a Wonderful Life, in which Henry Travers, a co-star of The Bells of St. Mary's, plays the guardian angel Clarence Odbody, the title of The Bells of St. Mary's appears on the marquee of a movie theater in Bedford Falls, New York. In The Godfather (1972), Michael and Kay see The Bells of St. Mary's at Radio City Music Hall.

See also
 List of Christmas films

References

Citations

Sources
 Sarris, Andrew. 1998. “You Ain’t Heard Nothin’ Yet.” The American Talking Film History & Memory, 1927-1949. Oxford University Press.

External links

 
 
 
 

1945 films
1945 comedy-drama films
1945 musical films
1940s Christmas comedy-drama films
1940s English-language films
1940s musical comedy-drama films
American black-and-white films
American Christmas comedy-drama films
American musical comedy-drama films
American sequel films
Films about educators
Films about Catholic nuns
Films about Catholic priests
Films about Catholicism
Films about Irish-American culture
Films directed by Leo McCarey
Films featuring a Best Drama Actress Golden Globe-winning performance
Films scored by Robert Emmett Dolan
Films set in schools
Films that won the Best Sound Mixing Academy Award
Films with screenplays by Dudley Nichols
Photoplay Awards film of the year winners
RKO Pictures films
1940s American films